The Hammond Berries were a minor league baseball franchise based in Hammond, Louisiana. From 1946 to 1951, the Berries played exclusively as members of the Evangeline League and captured Evangeline League championships in 1947, 1949 and 1951. The Hammond Berries played home minor league games at Berry Stadium, located on the campus of Southeastern Louisiana University.

History
Minor league baseball began in Hammond, Louisiana in 1946, when the Hammond "Berries" began play as members of the eight–team league Class D level Evangeline League in 1946, as the league was reforming. The Abbeville Athletics, Alexandria Aces, Baton Rouge Red Sticks, Houma Indians, Natchez Giants, New Iberia Cardinals and Thibodaux Giants joined Hammond in beginning league play on April 23, 1946.

The Hammond Berries finished their first season of play in last place. With a 44–87 record in 1946, Hammond placed 8th in the eight–team league, finishing 48.0 games behind the 1st-place Houma Indians, playing under manager Joe Valenti.

The 1947 Hammond Berries won the Evangeline League Championship. After placing 4th with a 73–60 regular season record, finishing 6.5 games behind the 1st place Alexandria Aces, the Berries qualified for the playoffs. In the first round playoff, Hammond defeated Alexandria 4 games to 1 in the series to advance. In the Finals, the Hammond Berries swept the Thibodaux Giants in four games to win the championship. Hammond was managed to the championship by Babe Benning and Paul Bruno. Home season attendance in 1947 was 59,126.

In 1948, Hammond finished with a 79–58 record, placing 2nd in the Evangeline League regular season standings, finishing 2.5 games behind the Houma Indians. Hammond played under returning manager Paul Bruno. The first round playoff series with the Thibodaux Giants was tied 2 games to 2 when the entire postseason was cancelled due to bad weather. Hammond had season home attendance of 62,346.

Playing for the Berries in 1948, Ray Sanner won the Evangeline League Triple Crown. Sanner, nicknamed "Tex," hit .386 with 34 home runs and 126 RBI on the season.

The 1949 Hammond Berries won their second Evangeline League Championship, as the league became a Class C level league. Hammond finished the regular season in 3rd place with a 73–63 record, finishing 5.0 games behind the 1st place Houma Indians and qualifying for the playoffs. In the first round of playoffs the Berries defeated the Lafayette Bulls 4 games to 1 to advance. In the Finals, Hammond beat the Alexandria Aces 4 games to 2 to capture the championship under manager Paul Bruno. Hammond drew 51,071 for the season at home.

After winning the Evangeline League pennant in 1949, Hammond lost four straight games to the Gladewater Bears, winners of the East Texas League pennant, in a best-of-seven interleague championship.

The 1950 Berries advanced to the finals. In the regular season, the Berries ended in 4th place with a 71–65 record, finishing 13.5 games behind the 1st place Lafayette Bulls. The Berries qualified for the playoffs, playing the season under managers Joe Kracher and Joe Powers. In the regular season, Ray Dunn hit 39 home runs to lead the league. In the playoffs, the Berries defeated the Lafayette Bulls 4 games to 1, before being swept by the Baton Rouge Red Sticks 4 games to 0 in the Finals.

In their final season, the 1951 Hammond Berries captured their third Evangeline League championship, before folding after the season. Their championship run was led by pitcher Jack Cardey, who led the Evangeline League with both 25 wins and a 2.67 ERA. Under returning manager Joe Powers, Hammond finished 3rd with a 73–64 record in the regular season, 2.5 games behind the 1st place Thibodaux Giants. In the first round playoff series, the Berries defeated the New Iberia Pelicans 4 games to 3. In the Finals, the Hammond Berries defeated the Baton Rouge Red Sticks 4 games to 2 to win the championship. Despite the success on the field, Hammond franchise folded after the 1951 season, where they drew 28,230 fans for the season.

The Hammond franchise was replaced by the Abbeville Athletics in the 1952 Evangeline League season.

Hammond has not hosted another minor league team.

Berry Stadium

The Hammond Berries were noted to have played minor league home games at  Berry Stadium in Southeastern Park, which was on the campus of Southeastern Louisiana College near Strawberry Stadium. The Berry Stadium site is now the location of SLU's Pat Kenelly Diamond at Alumni Field baseball grounds. Berry Stadium had a capacity of 1,800 in 1949 and expanded to 3,500 in 1950.

Timeline

Year–by–year records

Notable alumni
John Burrows (1948)
Joe Kracher (1950, MGR)
Irv Stein (1947)

See also
Hammond Berries players

References

External References
Baseball Reference

Evangeline Baseball League teams
Defunct minor league baseball teams
Professional baseball teams in Louisiana
Sports teams in Hammond, Louisiana
Tangipahoa Parish, Louisiana
Baseball teams established in 1946
Baseball teams disestablished in 1951
Defunct baseball teams in Louisiana